Héctor Lautaro Chiriboga Sandoval (born 23 March 1966) is an Ecuadorian footballer. He played in nine matches for the Ecuador national football team from 1987 to 1988. He was also part of Ecuador's squad for the 1987 Copa América tournament.

References

External links
 

1966 births
Living people
Ecuadorian footballers
Ecuador international footballers
Place of birth missing (living people)
Association football goalkeepers